Hobson, Alabama may refer to:
 Hobson, Jefferson County, Alabama
Hobson, Randolph County, Alabama, an unincorporated community
Hobson, Washington County, Alabama, a census-designated place
Hobson City, Alabama, a town